Leonid Romanov (born 13 February 1947) is a Soviet fencer. He won a silver medal in the team foil event at the 1972 Summer Olympics.

References

1947 births
Living people
Russian male fencers
Soviet male fencers
Olympic fencers of the Soviet Union
Fencers at the 1972 Summer Olympics
Olympic silver medalists for the Soviet Union
Olympic medalists in fencing
Medalists at the 1972 Summer Olympics
Universiade medalists in fencing
Universiade gold medalists for the Soviet Union